Tuck or the Tuck is a nickname of:

 William "Tuck" Andress, half of the American jazz duo Tuck & Patti
 Everett E. Kelly (1898–1983), American college football player
 James McIntyre (footballer) (1863–1943), Scottish footballer
 George Tucker Tuck Stainback (1911–1992), American Major League Baseball player
 Thomas Syme (1928–2011), British ice hockey player
 Trinity the Tuck (born 1984), American drag performer Ryan A. Taylor, nicknamed "the Tuck"
 George Tuck Turner (1866–1945), American Major League Baseball player
 Dave Tucker (geologist), American geologist known in his union as "Tuck"
 William Osborne Tuck Tucker (1961-2020), American actor

Lists of people by nickname